Ismail El Haddad (born 3 August 1990) is a Moroccan professional footballer who plays for Al-Khor as a winger. He is one of the fastest players in the Moroccan league. His ability with the ball in his foot is super powerful and fast inside the box. He played a very big role for Wydad Casablanca to win the CAF Champions League. His ability to score also and assist his teammates is very consistent.

Career 
In December 2020, he joined Qatar Stars League club Al-Khor.

International career

International goals
Scores and results list Morocco's goal tally first.

Honours

Club
Wydad Casablanca
Botola: 2016-17, 2018-19
CAF Champions League: 2017
CAF Super Cup: 2018

References

1990 births
Living people
Footballers from Casablanca
Moroccan footballers
Moroccan expatriate footballers
Morocco international footballers
Hassania Agadir players
Wydad AC players
Al-Khor SC players
Botola players
Qatar Stars League players
Association football wingers
Expatriate footballers in Qatar
Moroccan expatriate sportspeople in Qatar
2018 African Nations Championship players
Morocco A' international footballers